The Liebesinsel ("Love Island") is a small, uninhabited island on Lake Constance in Germany.

Geography 
The Liebesinsel is located on the Zeller See, a lake in the Untersee, which itself is part of Lake Constance. It is about 200 metres south of the peninsula of Mettnau. The island is part of the Mettnau Peninsula Nature Reserve in the borough of Radolfzell am Bodensee.

During the original cadastral survey of the region from 1867 to 1871, the Liebesinsel was surveyed for the first time. In simplified terms, it was represented as an irregular square and was given an area of 2 morgens and 150 square rods, which is more than twice the area measured in 2012.

History 
The island was the location for the 1956 regional film Die Fischerin vom Bodensee under the direction of Harald Reinl. On the island the night of love of the main characters, Hans (Gerhard Riedmann) and Maria (Marianne Hold) was filmed.

References

Literature 
 
 

Islands of Baden-Württemberg
Uninhabited islands of Germany
Islands of Lake Constance in Germany
Lindau (district)